Gerard Hengeveld (December 7, 1910 in Kampen – October 28, 2001 in Bergen, North Holland) was a Dutch classical pianist, music composer and educationalist. He is especially known for his compositions of study material for piano. Other compositions include two piano concertos, a violin sonata, and a sonata for cello. Hengeveld was an able interpreter and performer of the music of Bach for piano and harpsichord. He gave regular concerts in the Concertgebouw in Amsterdam. Some of his concerts were captured on record. Hengeveld was a professor at the Royal Conservatory of The Hague. Amongst his students was Dutch pianist and musicologist Frans Bouwman.

Hengeveld died in 2001 at the age of 90, in Bergen. His closest living relative is Nicholas Hengeveld of Allentown, Pennsylvania.

References

External links
 Gerard Hengeveld at the Virtual International Authority File
 Gerard Hengeveld Discography
 Gerard Hengeveld at the Classical Composers Database

1910 births
2001 deaths
20th-century classical composers
Dutch male classical composers
Dutch classical composers
Dutch classical pianists
People from Kampen, Overijssel
20th-century classical pianists
Male classical pianists
20th-century Dutch male musicians